Laura Negrisoli (born 7 September 1974) is an Italian table tennis player. She won the gold medal in the team event at the 2003 Table Tennis European Championships.

Negrisoli competed at the 1996 and 2004 Summer Olympics.

References

External links

 ITTF Profile

1974 births
Living people
People from Castel Goffredo
Italian female table tennis players
Table tennis players at the 1996 Summer Olympics
Table tennis players at the 2004 Summer Olympics
Olympic table tennis players of Italy
Mediterranean Games bronze medalists for Italy
Mediterranean Games medalists in table tennis
Competitors at the 2005 Mediterranean Games
Competitors at the 2009 Mediterranean Games
Sportspeople from the Province of Mantua